These authors and books have won the annual National Book Awards, awarded to American authors by the National Book Foundation based in the United States.

History of categories 
The National Book Awards were first awarded to four 1935 publications in May 1936. Contrary to that historical fact, the National Book Foundation currently recognizes only a history of purely literary awards that begins in 1950. The pre-war awards and the 1980 to 1983 graphics awards are covered below following the main list of current award categories.

There have been four award categories since 1996, Fiction, Non-fiction, Poetry, and Young People's Literature. The main list below is organized by the current award categories and by year.

The four categories' winners are selected from hundreds of preliminary nominees. For example, in the 2010 cycle the preliminary phase nominees ranged from 148 in the Poetry category to 435 in the Nonfiction category. In the 2013 cycle, the long−list phase nominees totaled 40 in September, 10 finalists for each of the four categories, with the year's 4 winners announced in November. Lists of five finalists were announced October 16

Repeat winners and split awards are covered at the bottom of the page.

Current award categories 

This section covers awards starting in 1950 in the four current categories as defined by their names. Some awards in "previous categories" may have been equivalent except in name.

Fiction 

General fiction for adult readers is a National Book Award category that has been continuous since 1950, with multiple awards for a few years beginning 1980. From 1935 to 1941, there were six annual awards for novels or general fiction and the "Bookseller Discovery", the "Most Original Book"; both awards were sometimes given to a novel.
Dozens of new categories were introduced in 1980, including "General fiction", hardcover and paperback, which are both listed here. The comprehensive "Fiction" genre and hard-or-soft format were both restored three years later.

The comprehensive "Fiction" category returned in 1984.

Nonfiction 

General nonfiction for adult readers is a National Book Award category continuous only from 1984, when the general award was restored after two decades of awards in several nonfiction categories. From 1935 to 1941 there were six annual awards for general nonfiction, two for biography, and the Bookseller Discovery or Most Original Book was sometimes nonfiction.

Multiple nonfiction categories were introduced in 1964, initially Arts and Letters; History and (Auto)Biography; and Science, Philosophy and Religion. See also Contemporary and General Nonfiction. The comprehensive "Nonfiction" genre was restored twenty years later.

Poetry 

Major reorganization in 1984 eliminated the 30-year-old Poetry award along with dozens of younger ones. Poetry alone was restored seven years later.

Young People's Literature 

See also the "Children's" award categories, immediately below.

Award for Translated Literature 

The first translation award ran from 1968 to 1983 and was for fiction only, the translated author could be living or dead (e.g. Virgil won in 1973).

The National Book Award for Translated Literature was inaugurated in 2018 for fiction or non-fiction, where both author and translator were alive at the beginning of the awards cycle.

Children's Books

Nonfiction subcategories 1964 to 1983 

This section covers awards from 1964 to 1983 in categories that differ from the "current categories" in name. Some of them were substantially equivalent to current categories.

Arts and Letters

History and (Auto)biography

Science, Philosophy and Religion

Contemporary

General Nonfiction

Other Fiction 1980 to 1985 

{| class="wikitable"
|+National Book Award for Fiction Subcategory winners, 1980–1983
!Year
!Category
!Author
!Title
|-
! rowspan="6" |1980
!First Novel
|
|Birdy
|-
!Mystery (hardcover)
|
|
|-
!Mystery (paperback)
|
|Stained Glass
|-
!Science Fiction (hardcover)
|
|Jem
|-
!Science Fiction (paperback)
|
|
|-
!Western
|
|Bendigo Shafter
|-
!1981
!First Novel
|
|Sister Wolf
|-
!1982
!First Novel
|
|Dale Loves Sophie to Death
|-
!1983
!First Novel
|
|
|-
!1984
!First Work of Fiction
|
|Stones for Ibarra
|-
!1985
!First Work of Fiction
|
|Easy in the Islands
|}

Miscellaneous

1935 to 1941 
The first National Book Awards were presented in May 1936 at the annual convention of the American Booksellers Association to four 1935 books selected by its members.
Subsequently, the awards were announced mid-February to March 1 and presented at the convention. For 1937 books there were ballots from 319 stores, about three times so many as for 1935. There had been 600 ABA members in 1936.

The "Most Distinguished" Nonfiction, Biography, and Novel (for 1935 and 1936) were reduced to two and termed "Favorite" Nonfiction and Fiction beginning 1937. Master of ceremonies Clifton Fadiman declined to consider the Pulitzer Prizes (not yet announced in February 1938) as potential ratifications. "Unlike the Pulitzer Prize committee, the booksellers merely vote for their favorite books. They do not say it is the best book or the one that will elevate the standard of manhood or womanhood. Twenty years from now we can decide which are the masterpieces. This year we can only decide which books we enjoyed reading the most."

The Bookseller Discovery officially recognized "outstanding merit which failed to receive adequate sales and recognition" The award stood alone for 1941 and the New York Times frankly called it "a sort of consolation prize that the booksellers hope will draw attention to his work".

Authors and publishers outside the United States were eligible and there were several winners by non-U.S. authors (at least Lofts, Curie, de Saint-Exupéry, Du Maurier, and Llewellyn). The Bookseller Discovery and the general awards for fiction and non-fiction were conferred six times in seven years, the Most Original Book five times, and the biography award in the first two years only.

Dates are years of publication.

Graphics awards 
The "Academy Awards model" (Oscars) was introduced in 1980 under the name TABA, The American Book Awards. The program expanded from seven literary awards to 28 literary and 6 graphics awards. After 1983, with 19 literary and 8 graphics awards, the Awards practically went out of business, to be restored in 1984 with a program of three literary awards.

Since 1988 the Awards have been under the care of the National Book Foundation which does not recognize the graphics awards.

Herbert Mitgang's report on the inaugural TABA begins thus: "Thirty-four hardcover and paperback books, many of which nobody had heard of before, were named winners during a generally ragged presentation of the first American Book Awards in a ceremony at the Seventh Regiment Armory last night. The event was designed to resemble Hollywood's Oscars, but instead there was little glamour. All the winners were barred from accepting their awards, and most did not attend."

Repeat winners

Books 

At least three books have won two National Book Awards.
Dates are award years.
 John Clive, Thomas Babington Macaulay: The Shaping of the Historian
1974 Biography; 1974 History
 Peter Matthiessen, The Snow Leopard
1979 Contemporary Thought; 1980 General Nonfiction, Paperback
 Lewis Thomas, The Lives of a Cell: Notes of a Biology Watcher
1975 Arts and Letters; 1975 Science

Authors 
At least three authors have won three awards: Saul Bellow with three Fiction awards; Peter Matthiessen with two awards for The Snow Leopard (above) and the 2008 Fiction award for Shadow Country; Lewis Thomas with two awards for The Lives of a Cell (above) and the 1981 Science paperback award for The Medusa and the Snail.

These three authors and numerous others have written two award-winning books.

Dates are award years.

"Children's" and "Young People's" categories 
 Lloyd Alexander, 1971, 1982
 Katherine Paterson, 1977, 1979

"Fiction" 
 Saul Bellow (3), 1954, 1965, 1971
 John Cheever, 1958, 1981
 William Faulkner, 1951, 1955
 William Gaddis, 1976, 1994
 Bernard Malamud, 1959, 1967
 Wright Morris, 1957, 1981
 Philip Roth, 1960, 1995
 John Updike, 1964, 1982
 Jesmyn Ward, 2011, 2017

"Fiction" and another category 
 Peter Mathiessen, 2008 and The Snow Leopard, two nonfiction categories 1979 and 1980
 Isaac Bashevis Singer, 1974 and A Day of Pleasure: Stories of a Boy Growing up in Warsaw, Children's Literature 1970

"Nonfiction" and nonfiction subcategories 

 Justin Kaplan, 1961, 1981 (Arts and Letters, Biography/Autobiography)
 George F. Kennan, 1957, 1968 (Nonfiction, History and Biography)
 Anne Morrow Lindbergh, 1936, 1939 (Non-Fiction, Non-Fiction)
 David McCullough, 1978, 1982 (History, Autobiography/Biography)
 Arthur Schlesinger, 1966, 1979 (History and Biography, Biography and Autobiography)
 Frances Steegmuller, 1971, 1981 (Arts and Letters, Translation)
 Lewis Thomas, 1975, 1981 (Arts and Letters and Science, Science)

"Poetry" 
 A. R. Ammons, 1973, 1993
 Alan Dugan, 1962, 2001
 Philip Levine, 1980, 1991
 James Merrill, 1967, 1979
 Theodore Roethke, 1959, 1965
 Wallace Stevens, 1951, 1955

Split awards 

The Translation award was split six times during its 1967 to 1983 history, once split three ways. Twelve other awards were split, all during that period.
 1967 Translation
 1971 Translation
 1972 Poetry
 1973 Fiction, History
 1974 Fiction, Poetry, Biography, Translation (3)
 1975 Fiction, Arts & Letters, The Sciences
 1980 Translation
 1981 Translation
 1982 Translation
 1983 Poetry, Children's Fiction paper, Children's Picture hard

Four of the ten awards were split in 1974, including the three-way split in Translation. That year the Awards practically went out of business. In 1975 there was no sponsor. A temporary administrator, the Committee on Awards Policy, "begged" judges not to split awards, yet three of ten awards were split. William Cole explained this in a New York Times column pessimistically entitled "The Last of the National Book Awards" but the Awards were "saved" by the National Institute of Arts and Letters in 1976.

Split awards returned with a 1980 reorganization on Academy Awards lines (under the ambiguous name "American Book Awards" for a few years). From 1980 to 1983 there were not only split awards but more than twenty award categories annually; there were graphics awards (or "non-literary awards") and dual awards for hardcover and paperback books, both unique to the period.

In 1983 the awards again went out of business, and they were not saved for 1983 publications (January to October). The 1984 reorganization prohibited split awards as it trimmed the award categories from 27 to three.

Notes 
 Split awards

 Other

References

External links 
 

01
01
National Book Award winners
National Book Award
National Book Award